Kraljev Vrh  is a village in Croatia. 

Populated places in Zagreb County